Surajpur is a Nagar Palika Parishad situated in the bank of Rihand River in Surajpur district of Chhattisgarh state in Central India. It is the administrative headquarters of the Surajpur district, located 334 km away from the state's capital city, Raipur. The National Highway 43 has its route through Surajpur.

Geography

Demography
Surajpur town has population of 20,189, of which males are 10,430 and females are 9759 as per the census of India 2011 data. Population of Children under the age of 0-6 is 2649, with 1419 males and 1230 females. Total literacy rate of Surajpur city is 79.89%, male literacy rate is 86.74% and female literacy rate is 72.66%. Sex Ratio is 936 females per 1000 males. Child sex ratio is 867 per 1000 male child under the age of six. Total number of households in Surajpur is 4397.

Education
Surajpur has a large scope for education and sports.The city is considered to be a base for higher education.

Schools and colleges

The only college for graduation and post-graduation is situated on the east part of Surajpur known as Surajpur Degree College with courses mainly Arts and recently Commerce has come into main frame for the student in Surajpur district.

The Government of Chhattisgarh is Planning to Open a school to Provide English Medium Education for the Regional students. Apart from this the Surajpur has a very good education background. Numbers of Hindi and English Medium Schools have come into existence after the formation of Chhattisgarh State:
 Navodaya Vidyalaya (Central Government School)
 Municipal School  (Government)
 Boys Higher Secondary School (Government)
 Girls Higher Secondary School (Government)
 Saraswati Shishu Mandir Hr. Secondary School (Private)
 Global Public School (Private)
 Aadarsh High School (Private)
 Sadhu Ram Vidya Mandir (Private)
 Pt.Viswanath Memorial School (Private)
 Govind Saraswati Shishu Mandir Hr. Secondary School (Private)
 Surya Kant Tripathi Nirala School (Private)
 Holy Temple Hr. Sec School (Private)
 East & West Mission High School (Private)
 D.A.V Public School (Private)

Transport

Road
Surajpur is linked with both Road and Railways. National Highway 43 Cross to link Katni towards North and Gumla & Ranchi towards east. Surajpur is directly linked to Varanasi Via Bhaiyathan → Pratappur → Renukoot → Robertsganj and is also well connected to Bilaspur, Chhattisgarh → Raipur → Bhilai → Nagpur.

Air
Raipur airport is the nearest airport from Surajpur. Surajpur is well connected with Raipur airport. Daily train / Bus are available from/ To Surajpur. The Nearest airport near Surajpur is Raipur (Capital of Chhattisgarh). One can take flights from Delhi for Raipur and use the connecting bus or train service directly from Raipur (Durg - Ambikapur Express is the best train to reach Surajpur). Almost all major cities of the country are connected through Raipur Airport. Indian Airlines, jet airways  and Air India are  Providing their Daily Service to all the Major airports of the Country.

Rail
The station provides connection with Bhopal, the state capital of Madhya Pradesh, Raipur, the state capital of Chhattisgarh, New Delhi, the national capital. Bilaspur is the headquarters of Southeast Central Railways and is well connected with mail and super-fast trains from Bhopal, Indore,  Mumbai, New Delhi, Gwalior, Ahmedabad, Kolkata, Ranchi, Jamshedpur, Patna, Lucknow, Chennai, Bangalore, Nagpur, Katni, Kota, Jaipur, Jammu & Hyderabad. Some of the important train connecting Surajpur Road are :
 04043/04044 Hazrat Nizamuddin - Ambikapur AC Express
 11265/11266 Jabalpur - Ambikapur Express
 18241/18242 Durg - Ambikapur Express
 18755/18756 Ambikapur - Shahdol Express

Besides this it halts for a few seconds at Anuppur station for trains like Garib rath, Utkal Express, Hirakud Express, New Delhi Sampark Kranti, Bilaspur - Rewa Etc.

Places of interest

Durga Mandir
Durga Mandir is situated at Tilsiva 1 km from Center of Surajpur.

This temple is also known as the Mahamaya Temple.

Gaytri Mandir
Gaytri Mandir is one of the famous and oldest temples, situated on the bank of river Rihand at Gayatri Nagar west in Surajpur. It is a temple of Goddess Sarda. Surajpur wakes up with the prayer "Gayatri Mantra", which can be heard at 5:00AM throughout Surajpur. The temple is surrounded by a nursery and parks.

Shiv Park
Shiv Park is developed by the local authority after the formation of Chhattisgarh. It is a popular place to hangout. Shiv park is situated on Gayatri Mandir Road at Gayatri Nagar (West).
but Nowadays it became a forest. No one take care of this park.

Mahamaya Mandir
Mahamaya Mandir is situated at Devipur 4 km away from Surajpur. Mahamaya Temple is one of the most famous and Oldest temples. People from different Places visit Mahamaya Mandir toworship and now it has become a major Tourist Attraction Place in Chhattisgarh. The people of Surajpur District has a great faith on Mahamaya devi and during Navratri this place becomes a major attraction and navratri mela is being organized by the people. The daily free bus service is being provided by the Bhakt mandaly of Surajpur for the pilgrimage and devotees to reach Devipur from Surajpur. A Huge arrangement is being made by the Local People and public Authorities as well.

Shyam Baba Temple

It is again a famous temple situated at Surajpur. Large Mela and Nagar Bhraman is being organised by the local people. Many people around Surajpur and other surrounding districts gather on the eve to celebrate Lord Shyama's Birthday. F

Kumeli Waterfalls

It is a waterfall situated about 15 km from the district headquarters of Surajpur. This waterfall is created by various water sources from deep green forests of Ketka range.

Rakasganda Waterfalls

It is a waterfall on the Rihand River. it is 104 km from Surajpur city. It is almost at the Uttar Pradesh and Madhya Pradesh border. It attracts tourists from all three states.

See also
Surajpur District

References

Cities and towns in Surajpur district